Following is a list of Roller Hockey International teams.  RHI was a professional inline hockey league that operated in North America from 1993 to 1999. It was the first major professional league for inline hockey.

List of teams 

 Anaheim Bullfrogs
 Atlanta Fire Ants
 Buffalo Stampede
 Buffalo Wings
 Calgary Rad'z
 Chicago Cheetahs
 Chicago Bluesmen
 Connecticut Coasters
 Dallas Stallions
 Denver Daredevils
 Detroit Motor City Mustangs
 Edmonton Sled Dogs
 Empire State Cobras
 Florida Hammerheads
 Lebeda Lawdawgs
 Las Vegas Coyotes
 Las Vegas Flash
 Long Island Jawz
 Los Angeles Blades
 Montreal Roadrunners
 Minnesota Blue Ox
 Minnesota Arctic Blast
 New England Stingers
 New Jersey Rockin' Rollers
 Oklahoma Coyotes
 Oakland Skates
 Orlando Rollergators
 Orlando Jackals
 Ottawa Wheels
 Ottawa Loggers
 Philadelphia Bulldogs
 Phoenix Cobras
 Pittsburgh Phantoms
 Portland Rage
 Sacramento River Rats
 San Diego Barracudas
 San Jose Rhinos
 St. Louis Vipers
 Tampa Bay Tritons
 Toronto Planets
 Utah Rollerbees
 Vancouver Voodoo

International teams